Argentulia montana is a species of moth of the family Tortricidae. It is found in Argentina (Neuquén and Chubut provinces) and Chile (Araucanía Region).

The length of the forewings is 6–8 mm for males and 7.5-8.5 mm for females. The forewings are bicolored, yellow orange in the basal half and dark brown in the distal half and brown along the base of the costal margin. The hindwings are uniform brown.

References

Moths described in 1893
Euliini
Moths of South America